is an East Japan Railway Company (JR East) railway station on the Hanawa Line in the city of Hachimantai, Iwate Prefecture, Japan.

Lines

Station layout
Kitamori Station has a single side platform serving a single bi-directional track. The station is unattended.

History
Kitamori Station opened on April 20, 1961 as a passenger station serving the village of Matsuo. The station was absorbed into the JR East network upon the privatization of JNR on April 1, 1987.

Surrounding area
National Route 282
Matsuo Post Office

See also
 List of Railway Stations in Japan

References

External links

  

Hanawa Line
Railway stations in Japan opened in 1961
Railway stations in Iwate Prefecture
Stations of East Japan Railway Company
Hachimantai, Iwate